Good Night, and Good Luck (stylized as good night, and good luck.) is a 2005 historical drama film about American television news directed by George Clooney, with the movie starring David Strathairn, Patricia Clarkson, Jeff Daniels, Robert Downey Jr., and Frank Langella as well as Clooney himself. The film was co-written by Clooney and Grant Heslov, and it portrays the conflict between veteran journalist Edward R. Murrow (Strathairn) and U.S. Senator Joseph McCarthy of Wisconsin, especially relating to the anti-communist Senator's actions with the Senate Permanent Subcommittee on Investigations.

Although released in black and white, it was filmed on color film stock, but on a grayscale set, and was color-corrected to black and white during post-production. It focuses on the theme of media responsibility, and also addresses what occurs when U.S. journalism offer voices of dissent from government policy. The movie takes its title (which ends with a period or full stop) from the line with which Murrow routinely signed off his broadcasts.

The film was a box office success and received critical acclaim for Clooney's direction, the writing, cinematography, production design and performances (particularly Strathairn's). It was nominated for six Academy Awards, including Best Picture, Best Director and Best Actor for Strathairn.

Plot
The setting is 1953, during the early days of television broadcast journalism. Edward R. Murrow, along with his news team, producer Fred Friendly and reporter Joseph Wershba, learn of U.S. Air Force officer Milo Radulovich, who is being forcibly discharged because of family members being known Communists and his refusal to denounce them.

Interest is piqued when it is found that the compilation of charges at Radulovich's hearing was in a sealed envelope and nobody saw them. Murrow presents the story to CBS News' director, Sig Mickelson, who warns Murrow that the story will bring serious accusations and repercussions to CBS and their sponsors, some of whom have government contracts. He reluctantly allows the story to air, which gains positive responses from the public. Murrow also tries to ease the worries of his colleague, Don Hollenbeck, who is struggling with both the strain of his recent divorce and attacks from newspaper writer Jack O'Brian, who is accusing him of being biased in his news reporting and being a "pinko".

While covering a story in Washington DC, Wershba is given an envelope suggesting that Murrow has previously interacted with the Soviets and used to be on their payroll. CBS's Chief Executive, William Paley, brings this up with Murrow. He warns Murrow that if any members of his staff are associated with Communism in any way, however remotely, they would have to recuse themselves from Murrow's next story. They were planning to make a direct attack on Senator Joseph McCarthy and his crusade against Communist infiltration in the U.S. government, which some denounce as a witch hunt. Friendly and Murrow gather their staff together, and when one of the team members voluntarily excuses himself because his ex-wife had attended Communist meetings before they even met, Murrow concludes that this kind of fear is what McCarthy wants. The team stays together and presents the story, which becomes highly praised by the public and the press, with the exception of Jack O'Brian, who continues to attack both Murrow and especially Hollenbeck on their supposed support of Communism. Hollenbeck pleads with Murrow to go after O'Brian, but Murrow reluctantly tells him that he cannot attack O'Brian while he is busy going after McCarthy.

As the team turns their focus to a filmed hearing of Annie Lee Moss, a Pentagon communication worker accused of being a Communist based on her name appearing on a list seen by an FBI infiltrator of the American Communist Party, they receive the news that Milo Radulovich is being reinstated by the Air Force, citing no direct evidence supporting any connections with Communism. McCarthy then asks for the opportunity to speak for himself on Murrow's show, which Murrow allows. McCarthy openly accuses Murrow of being a Communist, citing several pieces of evidence that seem to support it. Murrow broadcasts a rebuttal the following week, easily disproving McCarthy's accusations and pointing out that McCarthy didn't do anything to defend himself other than accuse anyone who opposes him as being either a Communist or a Communist sympathizer.

A few days later, the news arrives that the U.S. Senate is investigating McCarthy, which means the imminent end of his crusade. As the team celebrates, Friendly and Murrow learn that Hollenbeck has died by suicide. Paley then tells Murrow and Friendly that their news program's airtime is going to be severely cut, citing the high costs of the show's production, along with Murrow's attacks on controversial topics. Also, Joe Wershba and his wife Shirley, who have been concealing their marriage due to CBS forbidding co-workers from being married, are approached by Mickelson, who tells them that everyone knows of their marriage and that he will allow one of them to resign to save face, which Joe agrees to do.

The film is framed by performance of the speech given by Murrow to the Radio and Television News Directors Association at "A Salute to Edward R. Murrow" on October 25, 1958, in which he harshly admonishes his audience not to squander the potential of television to inform and educate the public, so that it does not become only "wires and lights in a box".

Cast

Production
In September 2005, Clooney explained his interest in the story to an audience at the New York Film Festival: "I thought it was a good time to raise the idea of using fear to stifle political debate." Having majored in journalism in college, Clooney was well-versed in the subject matter. His father, Nick Clooney, was a television journalist for many years, appearing as an anchorman in Cincinnati, Ohio; Salt Lake City, Utah; Los Angeles, California; and Buffalo, New York. The elder Clooney also ran for Congress in 2004.

George Clooney was paid $1 each for writing, directing, and acting in Good Night, and Good Luck, which cost $7.5 million to make. Due to an injury he received on the set of Syriana a few months earlier, Clooney could not pass the tests to be insured. He then mortgaged his own house in Los Angeles in order to make the film. Dallas Mavericks owner Mark Cuban and former eBay president Jeffrey Skoll invested money in the project as executive producers. The film ultimately grossed more than $54 million worldwide.

The CBS offices and studios seen in the movie were all sets on a sound stage. To accomplish a pair of scenes showing characters going up an elevator, different "floors" of the building were laid out on the same level. The "elevator" was actually built on a large turntable at the intersection of the two floor sets and rotated once the doors were closed. When the doors reopened, the actors appeared to be in a different location. In doing so, the movie exercised a bit of dramatic license—the CBS executive offices at the time were located at 485 Madison Avenue. CBS News was located in an office building just north of Grand Central Terminal (demolished and now the site of the MetLife Building); and the See It Now studio was located in Grand Central Terminal itself, above the waiting room. For dramatic effect, all three areas were depicted as being in the same building.

Clooney and producer Grant Heslov decided to use only archival footage of Joseph McCarthy in his depiction. As all of that footage was black-and-white, that determined the color scheme of the film. A young Robert F. Kennedy is also shown in the movie during McCarthy's hearing sessions. He was then a staff member on the Senate subcommittee chaired by McCarthy.

Music
A small jazz combo starring jazz singer Dianne Reeves was hired to record the soundtrack to the movie. This combo (Peter Martin, Christoph Luty, Jeff Hamilton and Matt Catingub) was featured in the movie in several scenes; for example, in one scene the newsmen pass a studio where she is recording with the rest of the band. The CD is Dianne Reeves's second featuring jazz standards (including "How High the Moon", "I've Got My Eyes on You", "Too Close For Comfort", "Straighten Up and Fly Right" and "One for My Baby"), and it won the Grammy Award in 2006 for Best Jazz Vocal Album.

Soundtrack
The soundtrack to Good Night, and Good Luck was released on September 27, 2005. The film's score was composed by Jim Papoulis.

Reception and legacy

Critical reception 
On review aggregator Rotten Tomatoes, the film holds an approval rating of 93% based on 226 reviews, with an average rating of 8.1/10. The website's critics consensus states: "A passionate and concise cinematic civics lesson, Good Night, and Good Luck has plenty to say about today's political and cultural climate, and its ensemble cast is stellar." On Metacritic, the film has a weighted average score of 80 out of 100 based on 41 critics, indicating "generally favorable reviews".

Roger Ebert, in his Chicago Sun-Times review, contends that "the movie is not really about the abuses of McCarthy, but about the process by which Murrow and his team eventually brought about his downfall (some would say his self-destruction). It is like a morality play, from which we learn how journalists should behave. It shows Murrow as fearless, but not flawless." Margaret Pomeranz and David Stratton from the Australian Broadcasting Corporation's film review show At the Movies each gave the film five stars, making Good Night, and Good Luck the only other film besides Brokeback Mountain to receive such a score from the hosts in 2005. Both described the film as "beautiful", but also praised Clooney for the film's importance. Pomeranz commented that, "[The film] is so important, because it's about things that are really vital today, like the responsibility of the press and examining the press' role in forming opinion." David noted: "Though [the film] is in black-and-white, there's nothing monochromatic about Clooney's passion for his subject or the importance of his message."

Jack Shafer, at the time a libertarian-leaning columnist for the online magazine Slate, accused the film of continuing what he characterizes as the hagiography of Murrow. Clooney's film gives the impression that Murrow brought down McCarthy single-handedly, while Shafer notes that in reality much of the mainstream media, many Democrats and some Republicans were condemning him before Murrow. Furthermore, Shafer writes, evidence obtained via the declassified Venona espionage program confirmed that many Soviet agents and sympathizers were in fact in positions of influence in the U.S. government, a disclosure the film entirely overlooks: "Clooney and company ignore the material that might argue against their simple-minded thesis about Murrow, the era, and the press to produce an after school special".

One complaint about the film among test audiences was their belief that the actor playing McCarthy was too over the top, not realizing that the film used actual archive footage of McCarthy himself.

Accolades 

The film received six Academy Award nominations, including Best Picture, Director (Clooney), and Actor (Strathairn). It was also nominated for six BAFTAs at the 2005 BAFTA Awards, and four Golden Globes at the 2006 Golden Globe Awards. The American Film Institute named Good Night, and Good Luck as one of the Top Ten Movies of 2005.

Television series 
As of November 2022, AMC is developing a television series adaptation of the film with Jonathan Glatzer as showrunner and Clooney as executive producer.

See also

 2005 in film
 George Clooney filmography
 History of CBS
 McCarthyism
 Tail Gunner Joe
 Television news in the United States

References

External links

 
 
 
 
 

Grammy Award for Best Jazz Vocal Album
2005 films
2005 independent films
2000s historical drama films
2000s political drama films
Japanese black-and-white films
Japanese historical drama films
French black-and-white films
French historical drama films
French political drama films
British black-and-white films
British historical drama films
British political drama films
American black-and-white films
American historical drama films
American political drama films
Drama films based on actual events
English-language French films
English-language Japanese films
European Film Awards winners (films)
Films about freedom of expression
Films set in the 1950s
Films about McCarthyism
Films about television
Films about the Hollywood blacklist
Films directed by George Clooney
Films produced by Grant Heslov
Films set in 1953
Films set in 1958
Japanese films set in New York City
British films set in New York City
Films with screenplays by George Clooney
Films with screenplays by Grant Heslov
Davis Films films
Redbus Pictures films
Tohokushinsha films
Metropolitan Filmexport films
Lionsgate films
Participant (company) films
Procedural films
Warner Independent Pictures films
Warner Bros. films
Biographical films about journalists
2000s English-language films
2000s American films
2000s British films
2000s Japanese films
2000s French films